Al Aan FM is an interactive radio platform that broadcasts from Dubai - United Arab Emirates to the Arab world. It is an interactive podcast platform that meets the aspirations of listeners, offering podcast episodes of a variety of political, entertainment, social and youth, in addition to hours of live broadcast from the event site.

You can always listen to this radio channel through Al Aan FM Application. The app allows the user to listen to its programs over the phone and share episodes on social media as well.

Launch
Al Aan TV launched Al Aan FM in August 2012 in Libya, it launched in Syria in October 2012 broadcasting live from the UAE.

Coverage and reach 
Another three hours of live are dedicated to both Libya and Syria highlighting the latest tweets (@alaanfmradio).

Al Aan FM has been launched to target the pan-Arab world via the Al Aan application.

Key Podcast Programs 

 Marsad Al Jehadia  One of the most important programs on Al Aan FM. It monitors and observes Islamist movements perceived as military movements; whose ideology is based on the Islamic notion of jihad.
 Fi Eishrin Daqiqa  A daily radio program that goes deep in discussing news and searches beyond the current and international affairs happening around us, from a point of view of News Makers, and how these events are affecting their lives. The program is introduced by “Bara’a Salibi”.
 Sarat Maei  A unique program presenting a series of secrets and lessons that we learn through stories and situations that participants can tell freely and without restrictions. “Sarat Maei” aims at reaching every listener of Al Aan FM.   The program is prepared and introduced by “Maha Fatoom”.
 Wait for our call  Through this podcast, we get to know our followers across the Arab world and learn more about their stories and experiences.

Frequencies
Libya

In Libya, Al Aan FM uses 105.3 MHz across the country, covering the following cities:
 Al Bayda
 Al Marj
 Al Majabrah
 Ghat
 Gadamis
 Jadu
 Kabaw
 Misrata
 Labraq
 Nalut
 Sabratah
 Susah
 Tripoli
 Waddan
 Wazin
 Zawara & Al Jmail

Syria

In Syria, Al Aan FM is available in the following cities and frequencies:
 Aleppo 96.6 MHz
 Al Tabqah 91.4 MHz
 Al Mayadin 97.6 MHz
 Ain Issa 91.4 MHz
 Ar Raqqah 91.4 MHz
 Azaz & Afrin 96.6 MHz
 Al Bab & Manbij 96.6 MHz
 Hama, Homs 96.0 MHz
 Idlib 96.6 MHz
 Latakia 96.6 MHz
 Qamishli & Amuda 94.6 MHz

Satellite
Badr 4            Frequency 12111 H SR 27500, FEC 3/4
Nilesat 201    Frequency 11938 V SR 27500, FEC 3/4

Logos 
The old logo was replaced with the new one on 1 October 2021:

 Old logo:
 New logo:

References

External links
Official Website
SoundCloud
Al Aan TV

Radio stations established in 2012
Radio stations in the United Arab Emirates
Mass media in Libya
Mass media in Syria